George Izard (October 21, 1776 – November 22, 1828) was a senior officer of the United States Army who served as the second governor of Arkansas Territory from 1825 to 1828. He was elected as a member to the American Philosophical Society in 1807.

Early life and education
George Izard was born in Richmond, England, to Ralph Izard, who was a delegate to the Continental Congress and United States Senator from South Carolina, and Alice DeLancey, niece of New York Governor James DeLancey and a descendant of Stephanus Van Cortlandt and Gertrude Schuyler. He graduated from the College of Philadelphia (present-day University of Pennsylvania) in 1792. He attended military academies in England and Germany and received military engineering instruction in France.

Military career

On November 4, 1794, Izard was commissioned a Lieutenant in the newly established U.S. Corps of Artillerists and Engineers. Returning from Europe, he was assigned to an engineer company at West Point, New York. From there, he was ordered to oversee the construction of Castle Pinckney in South Carolina.

In January 1800, Izard became aide-de-camp to Army commander Alexander Hamilton. A few months later he was invited by William Loughton Smith, Minister Plenipotentiary to Portugal, to serve as his secretary, a position he accepted. He left Portugal the next year and returned to the United States. He officially resigned his army commission in June 1803.

In March 1812, Izard was appointed as Colonel of the newly organised 2d Artillery Regiment. He was promoted to Brigadier-General a year later, and served as Wade Hampton's second in command until his resignation, when Izard succeeded him. Promoted to Major-General in January 1814, he was in charge of the Northern Army protecting Lake Champlain, until ordered to reinforce the Army of Niagara. He was discharged in June 1815.

Governor of Arkansas Territory (1825–1828)
Izard was appointed Governor of Arkansas Territory in March 1825, and served until his death in 1828. He died of complications of gout in Little Rock. Originally buried near the Peabody School there, Izard's remains were moved to Mount Holly Cemetery in 1843.

Legacy
Izard County, Arkansas, is named after him. The unit he commanded still exists as 1st Battalion, 3d Air Defense Artillery Regiment.

See also
List of governors of Arkansas
List of people with gout
List of University of Pennsylvania people

References

External links

 
 

1776 births
1828 deaths
American military engineers
American people of Dutch descent
Burials at Mount Holly Cemetery
Izard family
Governors of Arkansas Territory
Military personnel from South Carolina
People from Richmond, London
Schuyler family
United States Army generals
United States Army personnel of the War of 1812
Battle of the Châteaugay veterans
University of Pennsylvania alumni